There are three kinds of Seminaries in India:
 Roman Catholic Seminaries for churches that are in full communion with the Catholic Church and are affiliated with the Pontifical Universities in Rome or the Roman Curia,
 Ecumenical Seminaries for churches that are part of World Council of Churches and are affiliated with the Senate of Serampore College (University),
 Evangelical Seminaries for churches that are part of World Evangelical Alliance and are affiliated with the Asia Theological Association.

Most of the seminary degrees awarded in India are not recognised by the University Grants Commission. The Roman Catholic seminaries are often affiliated with Pontifical Universities in Rome or Roman Curia. The degrees and doctorates awarded by Senate of Serampore and Asia Theological Association (ATA) are not legally recognized  under Section 22 of  the UGC Act. The Senate of Serampore derives its power to grant degree from the Royal Charter granted by  King Frederick VI of Denmark. Senate of Serampore is also the first institution to grant degrees in India.

The degree titles such as 
 Licentiate in Theology (L.Th. or Th.L.), 
 Bachelor of Theology (B.Th., Th.B., or B.Theol.), 
 Bachelor of Sacred Theology (B.Th. or S.T.B.), 
 Bachelor of Divinity (B.D. or B.Div.),
 Master of Divinity (M.Div.), 
 Licentiate of Sacred Theology (L.Th. or S.T.L.), 
 Master of Theology (M.Th., Th.M. or M.Theol.), 
 Licentiate of Canon Law (J.C.L.)
 Doctor of Ministry (D.Min.), 
 Doctor of Sacred Theology (S.Th.D.), 
 Doctor of Theology (D.Th., Th.D. or D.Theol.) 
  Doctor of Canon Law (J.C.D.) and 
 Doctor of Divinity (D.D. or D.Div.) 
are not listed under UGC Act for the purpose of the Section 22 of the Act and hence can be awarded by seminaries without the approval of UGC.

The degree titles such as 
 Bachelor of Arts (B.A.), 
 Master of Arts (M.A.),
 Master of Philosophy (M.Phil.),
 Doctor of Philosophy (Ph.D or D.Phil.), 
 Doctor of Letters (D.Litt.) or (Litt.D.)
are listed under the purposes of Section 22 of UGC Act and hence only those institutions with university status as approved by parliament within the meaning of Section 2(f) of the UGC Act can confer such titles. According to Section 22(2) of  the UGC Act it is illegal in India for institutions other than those with university status as approved by parliament within the meaning of Section 2(f) of the UGC Act to confer research, professional or honorary doctorates, academic titles or degree certificate that are listed for the purposes of Section 22 of
the UGC Act. Therefore, most seminaries do not award these titles unless affiliated with a University.

Seminary students having degrees that are not listed under UGC Act  are not eligible to sit for public service examinations, or avail public employment or government research grant, etc. based on their degrees. Since there are no government or UGC approved theological institutions in India that provide degrees in biblical languages and Christian theology, the degrees awarded by these seminaries are accepted and recognised by universities and seminaries outside of India peninsular, especially in Europe and North America for further studies and research.

The following is a list of major Christian seminaries and theological colleges in India:

Major Seminaries and Theological Institutions in India
Some of the prominent Christian seminaries and theological institutions are shown below along with their year of establishment and academic affiliations and accreditation:
 Rachol Seminary 1609
 St. Joseph's Seminary (Mangalore), 1763 and re-established on 1879 affiliated to the Pontifical Urban University in Rome
 St Peters Pontifical Institute  1778, affiliated to the Pontifical Urban University
 Orthodox Theological Seminary, Kottayam 1815, member of Federated Faculty for Research in Religion and Culture (FFRRC) and affiliated to the Senate of Serampore College (University)
 Mar Thoma Syrian Theological Seminary, Kottayam 1926, member of Federated Faculty for Research in Religion and Culture (FFRRC) and affiliated to the Senate of Serampore College (University)
 CMS College Kottayam 1815, affiliated to Mahatma Gandhi University, Kerala (Theology faculty is currently defunct)
 Senate of Serampore College (University) 1818
 Serampore College 1818, affiliated to the Senate of Serampore College (University) and University of Calcutta
 Bishop's College, Calcutta 1820, affiliated to the Senate of Serampore College (University)
 Madras Christian College, Institute for Advanced Christian Studies 1837, affiliated to University of Madras
 Karnataka Theological College 1847, affiliated to the Senate of Serampore College (University)
 Baptist Theological Seminary 1882, formerly affiliated to affiliated to the Senate of Serampore College (University)
 Jnana Deepa, Institute of Philosophy and Theology 1893
 Papal Seminary 1893, affiliated to Jnana Deepa, Institute of Philosophy and Theology
 Aizawl Theological College 1907, affiliated to the Senate of Serampore College (University)
 United Theological College, Bangalore 1910, Autonomous (B.D.) and affiliated to the Senate of Serampore College (University)
 Mennonite Brethren Centenary Bible College 1920, affiliated to the Senate of Serampore College (University)
 Thrikkunnathu Seminary 1930-31, affiliated to the Senate of Serampore College (University)
Bethel Bible College 1927, accredited by Asia Theological Association (ATA)
 India Bible College & Seminary 1930, affiliated to the Senate of Serampore College (University) and accredited by Asia Theological Association (ATA) 
 Kerala United Theological Seminary 1943, member of Federated Faculty for Research in Religion and Culture (FFRRC) and affiliated to the Senate of Serampore College (University)
 Southern Asia Bible College 1951, accredited by Asia Theological Association (ATA)
 Gurukul Lutheran Theological College 1953, affiliated to the Senate of Serampore College (University)
 Dharmaram College 1957, affiliated to Dharmaram Vidya Kshetram, Bangalore
 St. Thomas Apostolic Seminary, Vadavathoor, 1962, affiliated to Paurastya Vidyapitham, Kottayam.
 St. John's Regional Seminary 1965, affiliated to Roman Curia
 Presbyterian Theological Seminary 1969, accredited by Asia Theological Association (ATA)
 Tamil Nadu Theological Seminary 1969, affiliated to the Senate of Serampore College (University) and Madurai Kamaraj University
 Faith Theological Seminary 1970, affiliated to the Senate of Serampore College (University) (G.Th, C.Th, B.A in Theology, B.Miss, B.D, M.Th, D.Th)
 Clark Theological College 1972, affiliated to the Senate of Serampore College (University) (B.D, M.Th, D.Th, Diploma in Church Music - DCMM)
 Evangelical Theological Seminary of ACA 1973, accredited by Asia Theological Association (ATA)
 New India Bible Seminary 1975, accredited by Asia Theological Association (ATA)
 Malankara Syrian Orthodox Theological Seminary 1975, affiliated to the Senate of Serampore College (University)
 New Life College 1978, accredited by Asia Theological Association (ATA)
 North India Institute of Post Graduate Theological Studies 1980, affiliated to the Senate of Serampore College (University)
Filadelfia Bible College 1981, accredited by Asia Theological Association (ATA)
Paurastya Vidyapitham, Pontifical Oriental Institute of Oriental Sciences, Kottayam, 1982.
 South Asia Institute of Advanced Christian Studies 1982, accredited by Asia Theological Association (ATA)
 Luther W. New Jr. Theological College  1989, affiliated to the Senate of Serampore College (University) and accredited by Asia Theological Association (ATA).
 South Asia Theological Research Institute 1989, affiliated to the Senate of Serampore College (University)
 Faith Baptist Bible College and Seminary 1997, accredited by Association of Baptist Bible Colleges & Seminaries in India
 Mary Matha Major Seminary 1997, affiliated to the Université catholique de Louvain, Belgium
Caleb Institute 2016, affiliated to the Senate of Serampore College (University) and accredited by Asia Theological Association (ATA) 
Advanced Institute for Research on Religion and Culture 2016, affiliated to the Senate of Serampore College (University)

Seminaries and Bible Colleges

Academy of Integrated Christian Studies
Aizawl Theological College
Andhra Christian Theological College
 APC Bible College, Bangalore
 Asian Board For Christian Theology-ABCT Chennai
 Bangalore Bible Institute & College 
 Baptist Theological Seminary 
 Bethel Bible College, Punalur
 Bethel Bible College, Guntur
 Bible Presbyterian Council College123
 Central India Theological Seminary
 Charis Bible College, Mumbai
 Charlotte Swenson Memorial Bible Training School
 C.O.T.R Theological Seminary
 Ebenezer Bible College
 Ecumenical Christian Centre
 Emmanuel Theological Seminary, Kota, Rajasthan
 Eva Rose York Bible Training and Technical School for Women
 Evangelical Theological Seminary
 Faith Baptist Bible College and Seminary
 Faith Theological Seminary, Jotsoma
 Gossner Theological College
 Grace Bible College (India)
 Gurukul Lutheran Theological College
 India Bible College & Seminary, Kumbanad
 Indian Theological Seminary
 IPC Theological Seminary
 Japfü Christian College
 Jnana-Deepa Vidyapeeth
 Karnataka Theological College
 Koinonia College of Theology, Pune
 Living Waters Institute of Theology
 Luther W. New Jr. Theological College
 Malankara Syrian Orthodox Seminary
 Maranatha Theological Seminary, Hyderabad
 Mary Matha Major Seminary
 Master's College of Theology
 Mount Zion Bible College, Mulakuzha
 Nagpur St. Thomas Orthodox Theological Seminary
 North India Institute of Post Graduate Theological Studies
 Oriental Theological Seminary, Chümoukedima
 Rachol Seminary
 Real Colégio de Educação de Chorão
 Shalom Bible Seminary, Zubza
 St. John's Regional Seminary
 St. John's Regional Seminary (Philosophate)
 St. Joseph's Seminary (Mangalore)
 South Asia Theological Research Institute
 South India Faith Baptist College & Seminary, Bangalore
 Southern Asia Bible College
 Tamil Nadu Theological Seminary
 Trinity Theological College, Dimapur
 Union Biblical Seminary
 Vidyajyoti College of Theology
 Global Ordination Disciples Diocese Theology Seminary https://goddiocese.org/

References

 
Christian organisations based in India